The 525th Air Defense Group is a disbanded United States Air Force organization. Its last assignment was with the 4710th Air Defense Wing at New Castle County Airport, Delaware. It was inactivated on 18 August 1955. The group was originally activated as a support unit for a combat group at the end of World War II in Italy and then redeployed to Maine, where it supported redeploying units until it was inactivated in 1945.

The group was activated once again in 1953, when ADC established it as the headquarters for a dispersed fighter-interceptor squadron and the medical, maintenance, and administrative squadrons supporting it.  It was replaced in 1955 when ADC transferred its mission, equipment, and personnel to the 82d Fighter Group in a project that replaced air defense groups commanding fighter squadrons with fighter groups with distinguished records during World War II.

History

World War II
The group was first activated in Italy as the 525th Air Service Group shortly before the end of World War II in a reorganization of Army Air Forces (AAF) support groups in which the AAF replaced Service Groups that included personnel from other branches of the Army and supported two combat groups with Air Service Groups including only Air Corps units.  Designed to support a single combat group. Its 951st Air Engineering Squadron provided maintenance that was beyond the capability of the combat group, its 775th Air Materiel Squadron handled all supply matters, and its Headquarters & Base Services Squadron provided other support. It provided support to a combat group in Italy in 1945.  The group redeployed to US and provided support to flying groups redeploying from Europe until it was inactivated.  It was disbanded in 1948.

Cold War
The group was reconstituted, redesignated as the 525th Air Defense Group, and activated during the Cold War at New Castle County Airport in 1953 with responsibility for air defense of Mid-Atlantic region of the United States. The group was assigned the 96th Fighter-Interceptor Squadron (FIS), which was already stationed at New Castle, and flying Lockheed F-94 Starfires as its operational component. The 96th FIS had been assigned directly to the 4710th Defense Wing. The group also replaced 82nd Air Base Squadron as USAF host organization at New Castle County Airport. It was assigned three squadrons to perform its support responsibilities.

One month after the group was activated, the 332d FIS, flying later model "Starfires" armed with Mighty Mouse Rockets rather than cannons, was activated as the group's second operational squadron. In July 1953 the 96th FIS upgraded to the newer model "Starfires" as well. The 525th was inactivated and replaced by the 82d Fighter Group (Air Defense) as part of Air Defense Command's Project Arrow, which was designed to bring back on the active list the fighter units which had compiled memorable records in the two world wars. The group was disbanded once again in 1984.

Lineage
 Constituted as 525th Air Service Group
 Activated on 12 May 1945
 Inactivated on 15 October 1945
 Disbanded on 8 October 1948
 Reconstituted and redesignated as 525th Air Defense Group on 21 January 1953
 Activated on 16 February 1953
 Inactivated on 18 August 1955
 Disbanded on 27 September 1984

Assignments
 Unknown, 12 May 1945 – 1945 (probably Air Service Command, Mediterranean Theater of Operations)
 Atlantic Division, Air Transport Command, 1945 – 8 October 1945
 4710th Defense Wing (later 4710th Air Defense Wing), 16 February 1953 – 18 August 1955

Components

Operational Squadrons
 96th Fighter-Interceptor Squadron, 16 February 1953 – 18 August 1955
 332d Fighter-Interceptor Squadron, 27 March 1953 – 18 August 1955

Support Units
 525th Air Base Squadron, 16 February 1953 – 18 August 1955
 525th Materiel Squadron, 16 February 1953 – 18 August 1955
 525th Medical Squadron (later 525th USAF Infirmary), 16 February 1953 – 18 August 1955
 775th Air Materiel Squadron, 12 May 1945 – 15 October 1945
 951st Air Engineering Squadron, 12 May 1945 – 15 October 1945

Stations
 Italy, 12 May 1945 – 1945
 Presque Isle Army Airfield, Maine, 1945 – 15 October 1945
 New Castle County Airport, Delaware, 16 February 1953 – 18 August 1955

Aircraft
 Lockheed F-94B Starfire, 1953
 Lockheed F-94C Starfire, 1953–1955

See also
 List of United States Air Force Aerospace Defense Command Interceptor Squadrons
 F-94 Starfire units of the United States Air Force

References

Notes

Bibliography

 Buss, Lydus H.(ed), Sturm, Thomas A., Volan, Denys, and McMullen, Richard F., History of Continental Air Defense Command and Air Defense Command July to December 1955, Directorate of Historical Services, Air Defense Command, Ent AFB, CO, (1956)

Further reading
 Grant, C.L., (1961)  The Development of Continental Air Defense to 1 September 1954, USAF Historical Study No. 126

External links

0525
Aerospace Defense Command units
Military units and formations disestablished in 1984
Military units and formations established in 1953